Office pour l'Information Eco-entomologique (abbreviated OPIE or OPIE-LR, English: Office for Entomological Information) is a French government organisation based in Guyancourt devoted to entomology, especially applied entomology.

External links
OPIE website 
Revue Insectes  (Insects Review)

Entomological organizations
Animal welfare organizations based in France
Organizations based in Île-de-France